Wierzchowiska Pierwsze may refer to the following places:
Wierzchowiska Pierwsze, Janów Lubelski County in Lublin Voivodeship (east Poland)
Wierzchowiska Pierwsze, Świdnik County in Lublin Voivodeship (east Poland)
Wierzchowiska Pierwsze, Masovian Voivodeship (east-central Poland)